Begamganj Gas Field is a natural gas field located in Begumganj Upazila, Noakhali district, Bangladesh.  It is under the control of BAPEX.

Location
The newly found oil-gas exploration zone is located at Begamganj gas field in Kazirhat of Kutubpur union, Begumganj Upazila, Noakhali district, Chittagong Division.

Discovery
Although the gas field was discovered in 1968, it was declared abandoned and later gas is found in it after 35 years.

See also 
List of natural gas fields in Bangladesh
Bangladesh Gas Fields Company Limited
Gas Transmission Company Limited

References 

Economy of Chittagong
Begumganj Upazila
Natural gas fields in Bangladesh
1968 establishments in East Pakistan